There were several figures named Elatus  or Élatos (Ancient Greek: Ἔλατος means "ductile") in Greek mythology.

 Elatus, a son of Arcas by either Leaneira (or Laodameia), Meganeira, Chrysopeleia or Erato and the brother of Apheidas and Azan. He was allotted by Arcas the region of then-nameless Mount Cyllene as his domain, but afterwards migrated to the region which later became known as Phocis, and assisted the local inhabitants in the war against the Phlegyans; he was renowned as founder and eponym of the city Elatea. An image of him was carved on a stele in the marketplace of Elatea. He married Laodice (daughter of Cinyras) and became by her, the father of Stymphalus, Pereus, Aepytus, Ischys, and Cyllen.
Elatus, a Lapith chieftain of Larissa, Thessaly. He was the father, by Hippeia, of Caeneus, Polyphemus, the seer Ampycus, Ischys who was beloved by Coronis, and a daughter Dotia, possibly the eponym of Dotion (Dotium) in Thessaly (see also Dotis).
Elatus, a centaur, killed during a battle with Heracles by a poisoned arrow that passed through his arm and continued to wound Chiron in the knee.
 The minor planet 31824 Elatus is named after this figure.
Elatus or Elaton, a charioteer of Amphiaraus, otherwise known as Baton.
Elatus, father of Euanippe, who was the mother of Polydorus by Hippomedon.
Elatus, a son of Icarius and father of Taenarus by Erymede.
Elatus, an ally of the Trojans from Pedasus, killed by Agamemnon.
Elatus, one of the suitors of Penelope from Same along with other 22 wooers. He was slain by Emaeus during the assault of Odysseus.

Notes

References
 Apollodorus, The Library with an English Translation by Sir James George Frazer, F.B.A., F.R.S. in 2 Volumes, Cambridge, MA, Harvard University Press; London, William Heinemann Ltd. 1921. ISBN 0-674-99135-4. Online version at the Perseus Digital Library. Greek text available from the same website.
Apollonius Rhodius, Argonautica translated by Robert Cooper Seaton (1853-1915), R. C. Loeb Classical Library Volume 001. London, William Heinemann Ltd, 1912. Online version at the Topos Text Project.
Apollonius Rhodius, Argonautica. George W. Mooney. London. Longmans, Green. 1912. Greek text available at the Perseus Digital Library.
Fowler, Robert L., Early Greek Mythography. Volume 2: Commentary. Oxford University Press. Great Clarendon Street, Oxford, OX2 6DP, United Kingdom. 2013. 
Gaius Julius Hyginus, Fabulae from The Myths of Hyginus translated and edited by Mary Grant. University of Kansas Publications in Humanistic Studies. Online version at the Topos Text Project.
Homer, The Iliad with an English Translation by A.T. Murray, Ph.D. in two volumes. Cambridge, MA., Harvard University Press; London, William Heinemann, Ltd. 1924. . Online version at the Perseus Digital Library.
Homer, Homeri Opera in five volumes. Oxford, Oxford University Press. 1920. . Greek text available at the Perseus Digital Library.
Homer, The Odyssey with an English Translation by A.T. Murray, PH.D. in two volumes. Cambridge, MA., Harvard University Press; London, William Heinemann, Ltd. 1919. . Online version at the Perseus Digital Library. Greek text available from the same website.
Pausanias, Description of Greece with an English Translation by W.H.S. Jones, Litt.D., and H.A. Ormerod, M.A., in 4 Volumes. Cambridge, MA, Harvard University Press; London, William Heinemann Ltd. 1918. . Online version at the Perseus Digital Library
Pausanias, Graeciae Descriptio. 3 vols. Leipzig, Teubner. 1903.  Greek text available at the Perseus Digital Library.
Publius Ovidius Naso, Metamorphoses translated by Brookes More (1859-1942). Boston, Cornhill Publishing Co. 1922. Online version at the Perseus Digital Library.
Publius Ovidius Naso, Metamorphoses. Hugo Magnus. Gotha (Germany). Friedr. Andr. Perthes. 1892. Latin text available at the Perseus Digital Library.
Smith, William; Dictionary of Greek and Roman Biography and Mythology, London (1873). "Elatus" 1., "Elatus" 2.
Stephanus of Byzantium, Stephani Byzantii Ethnicorum quae supersunt, edited by August Meineike (1790-1870), published 1849. A few entries from this important ancient handbook of place names have been translated by Brady Kiesling. Online version at the Topos Text Project.

Centaurs
Mythological Greek seers
Suitors of Penelope
Characters in the Odyssey
Arcadian characters in Greek mythology
Argive characters in Greek mythology
Laconian characters in Greek mythology
Lapiths in Greek mythology
Thessalian mythology

br:Elatos
de:Elatos